The Devon Rex is a tall-eared, short-haired breed of cat that emerged in England during the late 1950s. They are known for their slender bodies, wavy coat, and large ears. This breed of cat is capable of learning difficult tricks but can be hard to motivate.

Breed history
The Devon Rex is a breed of cat with a curly, very soft short coat similar to that of the Cornish Rex. They are often thought of as one of the most hypoallergenic cats available because of their type of coat. However, they are technically not hypoallergenic.

The first Devon was discovered by Beryl Cox in Buckfastleigh, Devon, UK, in 1959. The breed was initially thought to be linked with the Cornish Rex; however, test mating proved otherwise.

Appearance

Hair
Cats have three types of hair: guard hair, awn hair, and down hair. The Devon Rex's coat is unusual because there is little guard hair. 

The curl in Devon Rex fur is caused by a different mutation and gene than that of the Cornish Rex and German Rex, and breeding of a Devon with either of those cats results in cats without rexed (curled) fur. Devons, which are medium-sized cats, are often called "pixie cats" because of their unique appearance.

Other characteristics
Their uncommonly large, slightly rounded ears are set low on the sides of their wide heads, their eyes are large, and their noses are slightly upturned. Unlike most cats, their whiskers are very short and often curled to such an extent that it may appear as if they have no whiskers. Their body type is distinctly lightly built. Their long, sturdy legs are well suited for long leaps, and their toes are unusually large.

Many Devon rex cats also have hereditary myopathy, which is caused by a genetic variant known as COLQ and it appears anytime from 3 to 23 weeks of age. Typically, there is a chance that the myopathy in the cats might stabilize, however, most of the time, the condition worsens and the Devon rex cats die from laryngospasm, after obstructing their larynx with food.

Personality
The typical Devon is active, mischievous, playful, and very people-oriented. They have been described as a cross between a cat, a dog and a monkey (or, more famously, as "a monkey in a cat suit"). They are high-jumpers and will try to occupy any space large enough to admit them. With this trait, they are often found in odd nooks and crannies of a closet, shelf, or laundry basket. Devons prefer to be in high places and will go to great lengths to get to the highest spot in a room. They are relatively easy to take care of. Most Devons also have one central person to whom they devote their love, and on whom they will most often lie and rub. They like to playfully nip, and love to play throughout their lives.

They are a very intelligent breed; the typical Devon Rex can be trained to walk on a leash, fetch or perform all manner of tricks usually associated with canines, like jump, heel and tag to name a few.

Another common trait is their show of affection: they have a particular penchant for being close to the head or neck of their human companions and can often be found mounted upon one's shoulder or nestled into the cranny created by the neck and shoulder when one is prone. The Devon Rex is a faithful companion and will usually follow the object of their affection from room to room, waiting for the opportunity to leap onto their arms, lap, or shoulder.

Gallery

See also
Cornish Rex
German Rex
Selkirk Rex
LaPerm
Sphynx cat

References

Science and technology in Devon
Rex cat breeds
Cat breeds originating in England
Cat breeds